Chukadybashevo (Soqaźıbaş) is a rural locality (a selo) in Chukadybashevsky Selsoviet, Tuymazinsky District, Bashkortostan, Russia. The population was 359 as of 2010. There are 2 streets.

Geography 
Chukadybashevo is located 50 km southeast of Tuymazy (the district's administrative centre) by road. Kamyshtau is the nearest rural locality.

References 

Rural localities in Tuymazinsky District